Cantabile is a musical term meaning literally "singable" or "songlike".

Cantabile may also refer to:

 Cantabile (group), a British a cappella vocal quartet
 Cantabile (symphonic suite), a work by Frederik Magle
 Liuto cantabile, a ten-stringed mandocello
 Cantabile, a collection of poems by Henrik, Prince Consort of Denmark